Lee Ye-chan (born 1 May 1996) is a South Korean footballer who plays for Cheonan City FC as a forward.

Career
Lee Ye-chan has joined amateur club FC Pocheon in 2015.

He joined K League Challenge side Goyang Zaicro FC in January 2016.

References

External links 
 

1996 births
Living people
Association football forwards
South Korean footballers
Goyang Zaicro FC players
Seoul E-Land FC players
K League 2 players
K3 League players
Korea National League players